The 2015 Fort Lauderdale mayoral election was held on February 10, 2015 to elect the mayor of Fort Lauderdale, Florida. It saw the reelection of Jack Seiler.

The election was nonpartisan.

Results

References 

Fort Lauderdale
Mayoral elections in Fort Lauderdale
Fort Lauderdale